Van Burensburg is an unincorporated community in South Fillmore Township, Montgomery County, Illinois, United States.

References

Unincorporated communities in Montgomery County, Illinois
Unincorporated communities in Illinois